The third season of the comedy television series Modern Family aired on ABC from September 21, 2011 to May 23, 2012. Modern Family was officially renewed for a third season on January 10, 2011. The season was produced by Lloyd-Levitan Productions in association with 20th Century Fox Television, with series creators Steven Levitan and Christopher Lloyd serving as show runners.

This season like the previous seasons won the Primetime Emmy Award for Outstanding Comedy Series, Outstanding Supporting Actor in a Comedy Series for Eric Stonestreet (third consecutively and second for Stonestreet), Outstanding Supporting Actress in a Comedy Series for Julie Bowen (second consecutive), along with Outstanding Directing for a Comedy Series for Steven Levitan, among the fourteen nominations it earned. It also won the Golden Globe Award for Best Television Series – Musical or Comedy.

Production

Crew
The third season of the show was produced by 20th Century Fox Television and Lloyd-Levitan Productions and aired on the American Broadcasting Company (ABC). Modern Family is produced by co-creators Christopher Lloyd and Steven Levitan who serve as executive producers and show runners with Bill Wrubel as co-executive producer. The season premiere was filmed at a dude ranch according to Modern Family star Eric Stonestreet. The top choice for the setting for the dude ranch was Jackson, Wyoming. Other cities that were under consideration were Tucson, Arizona and Bozeman, Montana. The premiere will also be the first one-hour episode for the series. The season featured the second Christmas episode and the first Thanksgiving episode. The season also added new writers including Cindy Chupack as co-executive producer and Ben Karlin as consulting producer. On February 29, 2012, the cast filmed an episode on location at Disneyland. The episode aired on May 9, 2012.

Cast

Modern Family employs an ensemble cast. The series is set in Los Angeles and focuses on the family lives of Jay Pritchett (Ed O'Neill), his daughter Claire Dunphy (Julie Bowen), and his son Mitchell Pritchett (Jesse Tyler Ferguson). Claire is a homemaker mom  married to Phil Dunphy (Ty Burrell); they have three children, Haley (Sarah Hyland), the typical teenager, Alex (Ariel Winter), the smart middle child and Luke (Nolan Gould), the offbeat only son. Jay is married to a much younger Colombian woman, Gloria (Sofía Vergara), and is helping her raise her pre-teen son, Manny (Rico Rodriguez). Mitchell and his partner Cameron Tucker (Eric Stonestreet) have adopted a Vietnamese baby, Lily (Aubrey Anderson-Emmons). The kids are only required to appear in 22 episodes.

Near the end of the second season, there were rumors of the producers recasting the role of Lily, and changing her age from a baby to a toddler. In July 2011, a casting call for a "3- to 4-year-old daughter of Mitchell and Cameron" was put out by the producers. They eventually cast Aubrey Anderson-Emmons to replace Jayden and Ella Hiller. The season will also feature the developing of Lily's character. There is a possibility of Cameron and Mitchell adopting another baby although it is not definite. The season will also feature Haley's senior year of high school, and her being shown at least one prospect for college. The season will also feature several guest stars. In the season premiere, Tim Blake Nelson guest starred as a cowboy who "intimidates the guys and sends the girls' hearts a-twitter". Benjamin Bratt is currently slated to guest star as Manny's biological father and Gloria's ex-husband. This will mark Bratt's second appearance on the series. David Cross will also have a recurring role on the series as a city councilman who becomes enemies with Claire.

Episodes

Reception

Reviews
The season has received an overall mixed reception, most of which stated that the series had lost some of its originality and wit while falling prey to comedy clichés. Slant Magazine reviewer Peter Swanson wrote that while the first episode was "the type of wacky-location stunt that's usually reserved for the fifth or sixth season of a dying sitcom", the following episodes "have been better [...] but they're still uneven". He also criticized the writers for relying too much on "stunt episodes and celebrity cameos, like David Cross". He ultimately gave the season 3 out of 4 stars. HitFix reviewers Alan Sepinwall and Daniel Feinberg considered the season uneven and Feinberg criticized the season for the multitude of guest stars like David Cross. Sepinwall also criticized the writing for Bowen's character for being "shrill and angry". Despite this, they both complimented the performance of the kids.  James Parker of The Atlantic said, at the beginning of the third season that "Modern Family is very, very funny, almost ruthlessly so," [It's] a bit of a master class in pace and brevity ... The writing is Vorsprung durch Technik: hectically compressed but dramatically elegant, prodigal in its zingers and snorters but austere in its construction." He found it an exception to his dislike for sitcoms that eschew a laugh track.
Despite the recent criticism from some critics, the third season won its first Golden Globe Award for Best Television Series – Musical or Comedy, beating out two-time winner Glee.

Ratings
Like the previous two seasons, Modern Family aired Wednesday at 9:00pm and is coupled with Happy Endings. Aided by winning the Primetime Emmy Award for Outstanding Comedy Series for the second time, ratings for the one-hour season premiere, "Dude Ranch" / "When Good Kids Go Bad", rose up 18% compared to the previous season premiere, "The Old Wagon" making it the highest rated episode for the series and the highest rated ABC premiere in six years. "Dude Ranch" / "When Good Kids Go Bad" finished first in the ratings with a 6.2 rating among adults between the ages of 18 and 49. The high ratings have led to a rise in cost for an ad, with an average of $249,388 per 30-second commercial, making it one of the highest costing shows of the season.

Awards and nominations

Primetime Emmy Awards
Despite the mixed reviews, the third season received 14 Primetime Emmy Award nominations, the most nominations for a comedy, and won five of them.

Golden Globes
The show won the Golden Globe Award for Best Television Series – Musical or Comedy.

References

External links
 Episode recaps at ABC.com
 

 
2011 American television seasons
2012 American television seasons
3